Lasotki  is a village in the administrative district of Gmina Brudzeń Duży, within Płock County, Masovian Voivodeship, in east-central Poland.

The village has a population of 128.

References

Lasotki